The 1985 Men's Hockey Asia Cup was the second edition of the Men's Hockey Asia Cup, the quadrennial international men's field hockey championship of Asia organized by the Asian Hockey Federation. It was held in Dhaka, Bangladesh from 20 to 28 January 1985.

The defending champions Pakistan won its second Asian title by defeating India 3–2 in the final. South Korea won its first medal by defeating Japan 2–0 in the bronze medal match.

Preliminary round

Group A

|}

Group B

|}

Classification round

Fifth to eighth place classification

Seventh place game

Fifth place game

First to fourth place classification

Semi-finals

Third place game

Final

Final standings

References

Hockey Asia Cup
Asia Cup
Hockey Asia Cup
Sport in Dhaka
International field hockey competitions hosted by Bangladesh
Hockey Asia Cup
1985 in Dhaka
January 1985 events in Bangladesh